Giorgi Ovashvili (aka George) is a Georgian film director and screenwriter, known for his 2014 film Corn Island.

Early life and education
Giorgi Ovashvili is a  graduate of the film department of the Georgian State University of Cinema and Theatre (1996) and the filmmaking department of the New York Film Academy at Universal Studios in Hollywood (2006).

Career
Ovashvili made his debut as director with two short films, "Wagonnet" (1997) and "Eye Level" (2005).

His first feature film, The Other Bank,  premiered at the Berlin Film Festival's Generation section in 2009 and won over 50 international prizes, and was nominated at European Film Awards in the category "European Discovery".

Khibula (2017) was dedicated to the recent history of Georgia. The film was premiered in the main competition of Karlovy Vary IFF in 2017.

 Ovashvili is working on The Moon is a Father of Mine.

Production company
After having produced his own works, Ovashvili established his own film production company in 2016, Wagonnet Films, in Tbilisi.

Recognition and awards
In 2015, Ovashvili received a special award named "High Priest of Culture", along with director Zaza Urushadze, for contributing to and promoting Georgian cinema internationally.

Filmography

Director
 Beautiful Helen (2022)
 Khibula (2017)
 Corn Island (2014)
 Gagma napiri (2009), The Other Bank
 Eye Level... (2005)
 Wagonette (1997)

Screenwriter
 Beautiful Helen (2022)
 Khibula (2017)
  "corn island" (2014)
 Gagma napiri (2009) (adaptation), The Other Bank
 Eye Level... (2005)
 Wagonnet  (1996)

Producer
 Beautiful Helen (2022)
 Khibula (2017)
  "corn island" (2014)
 Gagma napiri (2009) (producer), "The Other Bank"
 Eye Level... (2005) (co-producer) (executive producer)
 Wagonnet  (1996)

Self - TV
 Euro Video Grand Prix (2006) (TV) .... Himself - Jury Member

References

External links

 The other Bank
 George Ovashvili: The Other Bank (Gagma napiri, 2008) reviewed by Julie Christensen © 2009

Living people
Film directors from Georgia (country)
Screenwriters from Georgia (country)
Film people from Tbilisi
New York Film Academy alumni
Year of birth missing (living people)
Media Wave Award winners